James C. Dent House is a historic home at 156 Q Street, Southwest, Washington, D.C., in the Buzzard Point neighborhood.

James C. Dent was born a slave in 1855, in southern Maryland. He was a laborer, and married Mary, a seamstress; in 1885, they helped found the Mount Moriah Baptist Church.

It served as a Community Assistance Center. Pepco owns the property.  Living Classrooms Foundation began operating the facility in 2019 as a community center to deliver hands-on education and workforce development programming serving residents of all ages living in the surrounding public housing communities of DC's Ward 6.

References

External links
http://dcmud.blogspot.com/2010/07/recognition-from-hprb-long-time-coming.html

Houses completed in 1818
Houses on the National Register of Historic Places in Washington, D.C.
Federal architecture in Washington, D.C.
Southwest Waterfront